"Hyena" is the fourth major and 12th overall single released by The Gazette. It is their lone single of 2007. It was released in two different versions: an Optical Impression (CD+DVD) edition and an Auditory Impression edition. The CD+DVD edition comes with a DVD of the title song's PV, while the CD-only edition comes with the B-side song "Defective Tragedy". "Chizuru" was used as the theme song for the film  Apartment.

Track listing

Hyena: Optical Impression 
Disc one
 "Hyena"
 "Chizuru (千鶴; A Thousand Cranes)"
Disc two (DVD)
 "Hyena Music Clip + Making"

Hyena: Auditory Impression
 "Hyena"
 "Chizuru (千鶴; A Thousand Cranes)"
 "Defective Tragedy"

Notes
 The single reached a peak mark of #4 on the Japanese Oricon Weekly Charts.

References

2007 singles
The Gazette (band) songs
2007 songs
King Records (Japan) singles
Song articles with missing songwriters